
William Craft Brumfield (born June 28, 1944) is a contemporary American historian of Russian architecture, a preservationist and an architectural photographer. Brumfield is currently Professor of Slavic studies at Tulane University.

Brumfield grew up in the deep American South, where he became interested in Russia by reading Russian novels. After receiving a BA from Tulane University in 1966 and an MA from the University of California, Berkeley in 1968, he arrived in the former Soviet Union for the first time in 1970 as a graduate student starting work in architectural photography, although he did not seriously study the craft of photography until 1974. Brumfield earned a Ph.D in Slavic studies at the University of California, Berkeley in 1973 and held a position of assistant professor at Harvard University in 1974–1980.

In 1983 Brumfield, formerly a generalist of Slavic studies, established himself in the history of architecture with his first book, Gold in azure: one thousand years of Russian architecture. It was followed by The Origins of Modernism in Russian Architecture (1991), Russian housing in the modern age: design and social history (1993), A History of Russian Architecture (1993, Notable Book of that year and a best seller
according to The New York Times), Lost Russia: Photographing the Ruins of Russian Architecture (1995), Landmarks of Russian Architecture: A Photographic Survey (1997) and Commerce in Russian urban culture: 1861-1914 (English edition 2001, Russian edition 2000).

In 1986 Brumfield organized the first exhibit of photographic prints from the Prokudin-Gorsky Collection at the Library of Congress. Since that time Brumfield has been actively engaged in the study of Prokudin-Gorsky's photographs, including several publications for the site "Russia Beyond the Headlines".

Brumfield lived in the former Soviet Union and Russia for a total of fifteen years, doing postgraduate research with Moscow State University and Saint Petersburg State University, but mostly travelling through the northern country, surveying and photographing the surviving relics of vernacular architecture. In a 2005 interview Brumfield, asked to tell which of those journeys stood out, picked a photo survey of Varzuga, a remote village connected to civilization by 150 kilometers of a sandy clay track. Brumfield donated his collection of around 1,100 photographs of Northern Russian architecture taken in 1999–2003 to the Library of Congress. His archives were digitized with assistance of the National Endowment for the Humanities and the University of Washington Library. The basic collection of Brumfield's photographic work is held in the Department of Images Collections at the National Gallery of Art, Washington, DC. The William C. Brumfield Collection consists of 12,500 black-and-white 8" x 10" photographic prints, 40,000  negatives and over 89,000 digital files, most of which are in color (nearly 149,000 in total).

In 2000 Brumfield was elected a Guggenheim Fellow for Humanities - Russian History. He has been a full member of the Russian Academy of Architecture and Construction Sciences (RAASN) since 2002 and an honorary fellow of the Russian Academy of the Arts since 2006. He currently holds the record for most domes captured in a single photograph.

In 2014 the D. S. Likhachev Foundation in St. Petersburg awarded Brumfield the D. S. Likhachev Prize "for outstanding contributions to the preservation of the historic and cultural heritage of Russia."

In 2019 Brumfield was awarded the Order of Friendship, “for the merits in strengthening friendship and cooperation between peoples, fruitful activities for the rapprochement and mutual enrichment of cultures of nations and nationalities.”

Publications 

 Gold in azure: one thousand years of Russian architecture (1983)
 The Origins of Modernism in Russian Architecture (1991)
 Russian housing in the modern age: design and social history (1993)
 A History of Russian Architecture (1993)
 Lost Russia: Photographing the Ruins of Russian Architecture (1995)
 Landmarks of Russian Architecture: A Photographic Survey (1997)
 Commerce in Russian urban culture: 1861—1914 (2001)
 Architecture at the End of the Earth: Photographing the Russian North (2015)
 Journeys through the Russian Empire: The Photographic Legacy of Sergey Prokudin-Gorsky. Durham ; London: Duke University Press Books, 2020.

With financial support from the Kennan Institute, the publisher «Три квадрата» (Tri Kvadrata) began in 2005 to release the series Открывая Россию/Discovering Russia by Brumfield:

  Totma: Architectural Heritage in Photographs (Moscow, 2005)
  Irkutsk: Architectural Heritage in Photographs (2006)
  Tobolsk: Architectural Heritage in Photographs (2006)
  Solikamsk: Architectural Heritage in Photographs (2007)
  Cherdyn: Architectural Heritage in Photographs (2007)
  Kargopol: Architectural Heritage in Photographs (2007)
  Chita: Architectural Heritage in Photographs (2008)
  Buriatiia: Architectural Heritage in Photographs (2008)
  Solovki: Architectural Heritage in Photographs (2008)
 Kolomna: Architectural Heritage in Photographs (2009)
 Suzdal: Architectural Heritage in Photographs (2009)
 Torzhok: Architectural Heritage in Photographs (2010)
 Usol'e: Architectural Heritage in Photographs (2012)
 Smolensk: Architectural Heritage in Photographs (2014)
 Chukhloma Region: Architectural Heritage in Photographs = Чухломский край: архитектурное наследие в фотографиях (Moscow, 2016; Discovering Russia, issue 15). 
 Pereslavl-Zalesskii: Architectural Heritage in Photographs = Переславль-Залесский: архитектурное наследие в фотографиях (Moscow, 2018; Discovering Russia, issue 16). 

With financial support from the "Vologodskie Zori" Fund (Vologda, Russia), the publisher «Три квадрата» (Tri Kvadrata) began in 2005 to release the Vologda series by Brumfield on the architectural heritage of the Vologda region:

 Vologda Album (2005)
 Velikii Ustiug (2007)
 Kirillov. Ferapontovo (2009)
 Ustiuzhna (2010)
 Belozersk (2011)
 Vologda (2012)
 .

Other publications:
 .
 .
 .
 .
 .
 .
 .
 .
 .
 .
 .
 .
 .
 .
 .
 .
 .
 .
 .
  Alt URL.
 .

 .
 .

Interviews

 .

Bibliography
 .

References

External links

 William Brumfield talks on Russian architecture at U.S. Embassy. Video by Anastasis.me.
 
 
 
 
  (original photographs 1999 to 2003) 
 
 
 
 
 
 My life in Russia: William Brumfield, America's authority on Russian architecture
 
 Journeys through the Russian Empire (Presentation)
 
 AMC Online | Public talk with William Craft Brumfield

1944 births
Living people
American art historians
Tulane University faculty
Harvard University faculty